Anatolie S. Sidorenko (born September 15, 1953 in Bălți, Moldova) is a doctor of physical and mathematical sciences and professor at the Technical University of Moldova. He specializes in condensed matter physics with the focus on electronic transport and magnetic properties of low dimensional systems – thin films and layered superconductors, design of superconducting devices and sensors. He made key contributions to investigation of novel superconducting materials and hybrid structures superconductor-ferromagnet, multiband and triplet superconductivity.

Biography 
Anatolie Sidorenko was born in 1953 in the city of Bălți, Moldova (then part of the Moldavian SSR of the Soviet Union). In 1970 he graduated with gold medal from School 37 with physical-mathematical profile in Chișinău, Moldova.

In 1975 he graduated from Technical University of Moldova, the Electro-Physical Faculty at the Chair of Semiconducting Devices, and became PhD student of the B. Verkin Institute for Low Temperature Physics and Engineering of the National Academy of Sciences of Ukraine in Kharkov, working under supervision of professor Igor Dmitrenko (who was the first detected in 1965 high-frequency radiation of Josephson junctions).

In 1979 he defended PhD thesis "Superconductivity of thin films of vanadium and tantalum" at the Institute for Low Temperature Physics and Engineering in Kharkov, then worked as a researcher at the Institute of Applied Physics of Moldova, Chișinău from 1980 till 1992. In 1981 he worked as postdoc in International Laboratory for Strong Magnetic Fields and Low Temperatures, Wroclaw, Poland; in 1983 – postdoc in the Lounasmaa Laboratory of Low Temperatures, Helsinki University, Finland; in 1987 – postdoc in Tata Institute of Fundamental Research, Mumbai, India. In 1991he got his doctoral degree (Habilitation degree), defended habilitation's work "Superconductivity of structures, based on transition metals and multicomponent systems". In 1992 he won the fellowship of the Alexander von Humboldt Foundation for 2 years scientific work at the University of Karlsruhe, Germany; in 1995 – 1999 worked as a guest scientist at the Institute of Physics at University of Karlsruhe, Germany. In 2000-2003 – as a guest scientist at the Institute of Physics of University of Augsburg, Bavaria, Germany.

In 2004 Anatolie Sidorenko won the State Prize of the Republic of Moldova for the cycle of works "Kinetic processes and cooperative phenomena in electronic materials and nanostructures", returned in Moldova and organized the Laboratory of Superconductivity at the Institute of Applied Physics of Moldavian Academy of Sciences. In 2008 he became director of a new organized Institute of Electronic Engineering and Nanotechnologies of Moldavian Academy of Sciences, developing new strategic direction of investigation – functional nanostructures for superconducting electronics and spintronics.

From 2020 till present Anatolie Sidorenko is a principal investigator of the Institute of Electronic Engineering and Nanotechnologies, and professor at the Faculty of Computers, Informatics and Microelectronics of the Technical University of Moldova.

He was coordinator of several international projects (INTAS, Volkswagen Foundation, A.v.Humboldt Foundation, BMBF, DFG, NATO SfP, FP-7, HORIZON-2020).

Since 2018 A. Sidorenko is coordinator of the collaborative project "SPINTECH" of the HORIZON-2020 program, which is supported by the European Union and coordinates research in superconducting spintronics of three teams – of Stockholm University (Sweden), University of Twente (The Netherlands) and the Institute of Electronic Engineering and Nanotechnologies (Moldova). The aim of the SPINTECH project is to boost the scientific excellence and innovation capacity in the field of spintronics – especially in the development of advanced technologies for design and fabrication of superconducting spin-valves.

In 2001 Anatolie Sidorenko was elected a member of the Deutsche Physikalische Gesellschaft (DPG), and in 2012 – member of the Moldavian Academy of Sciences.

Memberships 

 Member of the Deutsche Physikalische Gesellschaft (2001)
 Winner of State Prize of the Republic of Moldova (2004)
 Member of the Moldavian Academy of Sciences (2012)
 Member of the Mediterranean Institute of Fundamental Physics (MIFP), Rom, Italy (2011)
 President of Association of Physicists of Moldova (since 2019).
 President of Humboldt Association of Moldova ("Humboldt-Club Moldova", since 1997)
 Coordinator of the project "SPINTECH" which received funding from the European Union's Horizon 2020 research and innovation programme under grant agreement No 810144 (2018 – 2022)
 Outstanding referee of MDPI journals
 Editorial Board member of the journal "Beilstein Journal of Nanotechnology"
 Editorial Board member of the journal "Electronica"

Awards 

 Award of the orden „GLORIA MUNCII" of Moldova Republic (2019)
 "Honored Person of Moldova Republic" (2014)
 Prize of the Academy of Sciences of Moldova for the best scientific results in spintronics (2013)
 Member of the Academy of Sciences of Moldova (2012)
 Special Prize of the Academy of Sciences of Moldova (2011)
 Laureate of the State Prize of the Republic of Moldova (2004)
 "Honored Inventor of the USSR" (1988)
 Laureate of the State Prize "Boris Glavan" for young scientists (1982)

Selected publications

References 

Living people
1953 births
Academic staff of the Technical University of Moldova